Kolli Hills or Kolli Malai is a small mountain range located in central Tamil Nadu and spread over the Namakkal district and Tiruchirapalli district of India. The mountains rise to 1300 m in height and cover an area of approximately 280 km2. It is situated at a distance of 43 km from Namakkal and 120 km from Trichy. They are part of the Eastern Ghats, a mountain range that runs mostly parallel to the east coast of southern India. Home to the Arapaleeswarar temple, the mountain is a site of pilgrimage, but the area is also popular with motorcycle enthusiasts because of the high-altitude motorable terrain with 70 hairpin bends.

Origin of the name
The Mountain is named Kolli Malai after the name of Goddess Etukkai Amman (also known as Kollipavai) guarding the hills with her divine protection.

Historical references
The Kolli Hills are featured in several works of classical Tamil literature such as Silappathigaram, Manimekalai, Purananuru and Akananuru. Mahavidwan R. Raghava Iyengar in the research monograph Araichi Katturaigal has given exhaustive references to Kollipavai from early Sangam literature, concluding that the image is in Kolli Hills. The region was ruled by Valvil Ori around 200 CE, who is praised as one of the seven great philanthropists of ancient Tamil Nadu. His valor and marksmanship are sung by several poets, and his exploits are a popular part of folklore. Ori is said to have killed a lion, bear, deer and a boar with a single arrow.

The hills are said to be guarded by Kollipavai also called as "Ettukkai Amman", the local deity. According to legend, the sages chose Kolli hills when they were looking for a peaceful place to do their penance. However, the demons invaded the hills to disrupt the penance when the sages began their rituals. The sages prayed to Kollipavai, who according to the myth, chased away the demons with her enchanting smile. The Kollipavai hills is still worshipped by the people here and her smile is revered. The mountains have several mythological legends associated with them, and often come across as an eerie place in contemporary tales due to the unexplored and less traveled terrain. This mountain is full of herbs which retains health and vigour. E. D. Israel Oliver King of MS Swaminathan Research Foundation has documented over 250 sacred forests in Kolli Hills in the year 2005.

Infrastructure

The Kolli hills became taluk and forms a part of Namakkal district. Semmedu village is the headquarters for the Kolli Hills block and Semmedu is connected by road from Namakkal and Salem. Nowadays the Bus service is provided up to Arappaleeswarar Temple. BSNL (earlier DOT) established the first Telecommunication networks (LDPCO) in 1977 and afterwards the Telecom facilities are continuously expanded depending upon the requirements at Kolli hills.

Farming
Apart from its historical significance, the mountains are covered with Tropical Moist Mixed evergreen forests, but increasing areas of forests have been cleared for farming. Farm products of the mountain ranges include black pepper, jackfruit, banana, pineapple, Oranges, Tapioca, and other spices. Rice and other minor millets (Foxtail, Finger Millet and Little Millet) form the staple food of the tribal people who inhabit these mountains. The jackfruit grown on these mountains is well known for its taste and fragrance and is often soaked in wild honey that is also harvested from these mountains.

Reserve forests
The mountains are covered by green vegetation in the spring and monsoon, and are streaked with streams. There are three reserve forests that are controlled by the Government of Tamil Nadu, namely Ariyur Solai, Kundur Nadu, Pulianjolai.

Religious significance

The mountain is a site of pilgrimage, because of the Arapaleeswarar temple, which is believed to have a secret path to the Shiva temple in Rasipuram. This Shiva temple is said to have been built by Valvil Ori in the 1st or 2nd century when he ruled this area. "Arappaleeswara sathakam" is a poem which praises Lord Arappaleeswarar. It is believed that this temple existed during the Sangam period itself.

According to legend, the Shiva linga in the temple was found when a farmer was ploughing his land. It is said that the farmer accidentally hit the Shiva linga while ploughing, and that led blood to ooze out of the statue. The small wound is said to be visible on the Shiva linga even today.

There is also a temple for Ettukai Amman or Kolli Pavai which is one of the oldest in the town and the place itself derives its name.

Tourism

Kolli Hills is visited by nature lovers, hikers, trekking clubs, tourists and meditation practitioners among hill stations in Tamil Nadu. Agaya Gangai is the waterfall situated near the Arappaleeswarar temple.

Surrounding places
Under the foothills of the Kolli Hills many small and big towns exist. From these places the Kolli Hills is visible in a panoramic view and the climatic conditions of these places is influenced by the climatic conditions of the Kolli Hills. Following are the few Towns surrounding the Kolli Hills: Namakkal, Kalappanaickenpatti, Belukurichi, SingalandaPuram, Rasipuram, Namagiripettai, Thammampatti, Mullukurichi, Koppampatty, Thuraiyur, Puliancholai, Thathaiyangarpet, B Mettur and all these places are well connected by bus services.

People of Kolli Hills come down by foot with their produces to the foothills of Kolli Hills and they sell their produces and go back after buying their required materials. This type of activities take place in few places like, Karavalli, Belukurichi, Pavithram, Thammampatti, and Puliancholai. People from various surrounding places of Tamil Nadu come to Belukurichi to buy the products of Kolli Malai.

Flora and fauna
Forests here are rich and diverse. Higher up the slopes, patches of tropical evergreen forests occur and the Ariyur Shola is one such. These forests are home to several species of endemic trees and plants. Kolli hills is said to have the largest expanse of evergreen or shola forest cover anywhere in the entire Southern part of the Eastern Ghats. Several coffee plantations, fruit orchards and silver-oak estates occur in this region.

Wildlife such as the sloth bear, barking deer, slender loris, Indian pangolin, jackals, mongoose, palm civet, and many reptiles including endemic species like the lizards Draco dussumieri, Varanus bengalensis, Calotes calotes, and rare, non venomous snake of the family Uropeltidae including the recently discovered Uropeltis rajendrani, Rhinophis goweri, the endangered Python molurus and a number of birds such as Crested Serpent Eagle, Indian Grey Hornbill, laughing thrush are found in Kolli Hills. Among these lizards such as Hemiphyllodactylus kolliensis and Hemidactylus kolliensis are endemic only to Kolli Hills.

See also
 Paul Brand
 Agaya Gangai
 Masi periasamy

References

Further reading 
 R. Raghava Iyengar, Araichi Katturaigal, New Era Publications, Chennai, India (1987).

Hills of Tamil Nadu
Mountains of Tamil Nadu
Eastern Ghats
Namakkal district
Hill stations in Tamil Nadu
South Deccan Plateau dry deciduous forests
Tourist attractions in Tamil Nadu